Atomic Bitchwax II (also abbreviated as II) is the second studio album by American rock band The Atomic Bitchwax, released on October 31, 2000 via Tee Pee Records.

Track listing
All songs by The Atomic Bitchwax unless noted.
 "Ice Pick Freek" – 2:56
 "Forty-Five" – 3:50
 "Play the Game" (Atomic Rooster) – 3:52
 "Smokescreen" – 5:53
 "Cast Aside Your Masks" – 5:08
 "The Cloning Chamber" - 2:51
 "Marching on the Skulls of the Dead" - 5:06
 "Dishing Out a Heavy Dose of Tough Love" - 3:58
 "Solid" - 8:17
 "Liquor Queen" - 2:47

Personnel

 Chris Kosnik  -  bass, vocals
 Ed Mundell  -  guitar
 Keith Ackerman  -  drums, percussion

Additional musicians
 Warren Haynes - lead guitar on "Smokescreen"
 Jordan Shapiro - organ on "Play the Game"

References

The Atomic Bitchwax albums
2000 albums
Tee Pee Records albums